Carl Edwin Douglas (born May 8, 1955) is an American civil rights, wrongful death, personal injury, employment, and criminal defense attorney specializing in police misconduct cases. He is best known for being one of the defense attorneys in the O. J. Simpson murder case, who were collectively dubbed the "Dream Team". Douglas was the managing attorney at the law office of Johnnie Cochran Jr., before leaving to establish The Douglas Law Group  in 1998. The practice is now known as Douglas / Hicks Law. Douglas' other notable clients have included: singer Michael Jackson, actors Jamie Foxx and Queen Latifah, and former NFL safety Darren Sharper.

Education
Douglas earned his undergraduate degree at Northwestern University and his Juris Doctor (J.D.) degree at the University of California, Berkeley.

Career
Douglas, as the managing attorney at the Law Office of Johnnie Cochran Jr., was known in many law circles as one of Cochran's top attorneys. Douglas, viewed as Cochran's lead co-counsel, was involved with Cochran cases representing rappers Tupac Shakur and Sean "Puffy" Combs, as well as Diff'rent Strokes star Todd Bridges. Within a year after leaving the Cochran firm, Douglas was one of the lawyers in the biggest verdict of 1999, in the case of Patricia Anderson vs. General Motors. In the verdict, General Motors was ordered to pay a record price of $4.9 billion for damages when two women and four children were trapped inside a 1979 Chevrolet Malibu, and the gas tank exploded on Christmas Eve of 1993. At the time, experts said it was the largest verdict for a personal injury case in history.

In March 2008, Douglas filed a lawsuit in excess of $10 million against the City of Los Angeles and the Los Angeles Police Department for the shooting death of Maurice Cox, an unarmed motorist, who was driving in South LA. Most of the shooting was captured on video by Alex Alonso, a filmmaker who posted the footage on www.streetgangs.com the same night.

On February 12, 2009, it was reported that Douglas would represent Elgin Baylor in a lawsuit against the Los Angeles Clippers, various of their executives and the NBA, alleging race and age discrimination issues in the Clippers franchise. This suit was unsuccessful; the racial discrimination count was voluntarily dismissed (dropped), and the jury found unanimously for defendants on the other counts.

Douglas was interviewed in Ezra Edelman's Academy-Award winning 2016 documentary, O.J.: Made in America, regarding his involvement in the O.J. Simpson murder case. In the documentary, Douglas defended the Dream Team's decision to inject race into the trial in order to exploit the team’s theory of deep mistrust of the criminal justice system by the predominantly Black jury. Douglas also discusses the staging of Simpson's house for a jury visit, during the trial, and a process that included replacing most framed photos of Simpson’s white friends with photos of Black people. Near the end of the documentary, Douglas expresses his disappointment in Simpson’s 2007 robbery arrest and subsequent conviction. Douglas said that in his opinion Simpson's thirty-three year prison sentence, on the thirteenth anniversary of his double-murder acquittal, was payback by the predominantly-white Nevada jury for the murders of Nicole Brown and Ron Goldman. Douglas referred to the jury’s verdict as the "fifth quarter" of a hypothetical football game.

Douglas has a law office in Beverly Hills, California.

Honorable recognition
In 1994, and again in 1999, he was honored as the "Loren Miller Lawyer of the Year" by the John M. Langston Bar Association.
 In 2007, he was honored as the Consumer Attorneys' Association of Los Angeles "Trial Lawyer of the Year".

References

1955 births
Living people
African-American lawyers
Criminal defense lawyers
Lawyers from Los Angeles
Northwestern University alumni
O. J. Simpson murder case
UC Berkeley School of Law alumni